Hondius Inlet is the 5.7 km wide ice-filled inlet indenting for 6.7 km the tip of Joerg Peninsula, Bowman Coast on the Antarctic Peninsula southeast of Three Slice Nunatak. Its head is fed by Getman Ice Piedmont.

The geographic feature is named after the Flemish cartographer Jodocus Hondius (1563–1612), whose map in 1595 depicted the southern continent Terra Australis being separated from Tierra del Fuego and New Guinea.

Location
British mapping in 1963 and 1976.

Maps
 British Antarctic Territory.  Scale 1:200,000 topographic map. DOS 610 Series, Sheet W 68 64. Directorate of Overseas Surveys, Tolworth, UK, 1963.
 British Antarctic Territory: Palmer Land. Scale 1:250,000 topographic map. BAS 250 Series, Sheet SR 19–20. London, 1976.
 Antarctic Digital Database (ADD). Scale 1:250,000 topographic map of Antarctica. Scientific Committee on Antarctic Research (SCAR). Since 1993, regularly upgraded and updated.

References

 Hondius Inlet. SCAR Composite Antarctic Gazetteer.
 Bulgarian Antarctic Gazetteer. Antarctic Place-names Commission. (details in Bulgarian, basic data in English)

External links
 Hondius Inlet. Copernix satellite image

Inlets of Graham Land
Bowman Coast